Dishwasher detergent is a detergent made for washing dishes in a dishwasher. Dishwasher detergent is different from dishwashing liquid made to wash dishes by hand.

Uses
When using a dishwasher, the user must select a special detergent for its use. All detergents are designed for use after the user scrapes leftover food from the dishes before washing. To function, the user places dishes in the dishwasher in such fashion that the surface of all dishes is open to the flow of water.

Most dishwasher detergents are incompatible for use with silver, brass, cast iron, bronze, aluminum, pewter, and goldleaf. They can also harm disposable plastic, anything wood, knives with hollow handles, and fine glassware.

Types
 
There are specific examples of chemical reactions we use in our everyday lives. For example, a dishwasher detergent uses sodium hypochlorite and sodium carbonate (simple bleach) in a chemical reaction to clean the dishes. Dishes washed in cold water are less clean than dishes washed in hot water.

Composition
Different kinds of dishwashing detergent contain different combinations of ingredients. Common ingredients include:

 Phosphates: Bind calcium and magnesium ions to prevent 'hard-water' type limescale deposits. They can cause ecological damage, and have been partially banned or phased out.
 Oxygen-based bleaching agents (older-style powders and liquids contain chlorine-based bleaching agents): Break up and bleach organic deposits.
 Non-ionic surfactants: Lower the surface tension of the water, emulsifies oil, lipid and fat food deposits, prevents droplet spotting on drying.
 Alkaline salts: These are a primary component in older and original-style dishwasher detergent powders. Highly alkaline salts attack and dissolve grease, but are extremely corrosive (fatal) if swallowed. Salts used may include metasilicates, alkali metal hydroxides, sodium carbonate etc.
 Enzymes: Break up protein-based food deposits, and possibly oil, lipid and fat deposits. The enzymes used are similar to the ones used in laundry.
 Anti-corrosion agent(s): Often sodium silicate, this prevents corrosion of dishwasher components.

Dishwashing detergent may also contain:

 Anti-foaming agents: Foam interferes with the washing action. Foam may affect operation of the machine's water-level sensors and will leak past the door seals.
 Additives to slow down the removal of glaze & patterns from glazed ceramics
 Perfumes
 Anti-caking agents (in granular detergent)
 Starches (in tablet based detergents)
 Gelling agents (in liquid/gel based detergents)

Dishwasher detergents are generally strongly alkaline (basic).

Inexpensive powders may contain sand. Such detergents may harm the dishes and the dishwasher. Powdered detergents are more likely to cause fading on china patterns.

Besides older style detergents for dishwashers, biodegradable detergents also exist for dishwashers. These detergents may be more environmentally friendly than conventional detergents.

Hand-washing dish detergent (washing up liquid) creates a large foam of bubbles which will leak from the dishwasher.

Rinse aid
Rinse aid (sometimes called rinse agent) contains surfactants and uses Marangoni stress to prevent droplet formation, so that water drains from the surfaces in thin sheets, rather than forming droplets.

Rinse aid prevents "spotting" on glassware (caused by droplets of water drying and leaving behind dissolved limescale minerals), and can also improve drying performance as there is less water remaining to be dried. A thinner sheet of water also has a much larger surface area than a droplet of the same volume, which increases the likelihood of water molecules evaporating.

See also
 Dishwashing liquid
 Cleaning agent
 List of cleaning agents
 List of cleaning products
 Soap
 Green cleaning
 Washing

References

 Types of Dishwasher Detergent

Detergents
Dishwashing
Cleaning products